State Route 613 (SR 613) is an east–west state highway in the northwestern portion of the U.S. state of Ohio.

Route description
From the Indiana state line, State Route 613 follows a generally easterly direction through small towns such as Payne, Oakwood, and Continental.  It shares a route with State Route 634 for  before entering Continental.  After Continental, the route continues east into Leipsic, then into McComb, where it shares a route with State Route 235 for a short distance.

It continues in an eastern direction, drifting north, through Van Buren, until it meets State Route 18 south of Bloomdale. When the routes meet up with US 23 and SR 199 in Fostoria, SR 18 continues south along US 23 and SR 199 while SR 613 ends.

History

1970 – Original route certified; no significant changes since its certification; routed along a previous alignment of State Route 113, which carries the following history:
1926 – Indiana state line to Payne routed along the former alignment of State Route 111, and from Payne to 3¼ miles west of Leipsic along a previously unnumbered road.
1932 – Extended east to McComb along a previously unnumbered road from 3¼ miles west of Leipsic to Leipsic, and along the former alignment of State Route 187 from Leipsic to McComb.

From 1938 to 1943
1943 – Entire route certified as State Route 175 (this segment decertified in 1968).

In Fostoria, SR 613 formerly continued east of US 23 and SR 199 along North Avenue and North Poplar Street before ending at SR 12. In 2012, the City of Fostoria and ODOT proposed removing this segment of SR 613 from the state highway system due to the narrow streets with the aim of reducing truck traffic through the city.

Major intersections

References

613
Transportation in Paulding County, Ohio
Transportation in Putnam County, Ohio
Transportation in Hancock County, Ohio
Transportation in Seneca County, Ohio